Pavel Radnyonak (born 30 July 1964) is a Belarusian professional football coach and a former player. He is the manager of Energetik-BGU Minsk.

Career
As a player, he made his professional debut in the Soviet Top League in 1984 for FC Dinamo Minsk.

Honours
Dinamo Minsk
 Belarusian Premier League champion: 1992
 Belarusian Cup winner: 1992

European club competitions
With FC Dinamo Minsk.

 UEFA Cup 1986–87: 1 game, 1 goal.
 European Cup Winners' Cup 1987–88: 4 games.
 UEFA Cup 1988–89: 4 games.

References

External links

1964 births
Living people
Soviet footballers
Belarusian footballers
Association football defenders
Belarus international footballers
Belarusian expatriate footballers
Expatriate footballers in Russia
Expatriate footballers in Ukraine
Belarusian expatriate sportspeople in Ukraine
Russian Premier League players
Ukrainian Premier League players
Belarusian Premier League players
FC Dinamo Minsk players
NK Veres Rivne players
FC Tyumen players
FC Ataka Minsk players
Belarusian football managers
Belarusian expatriate football managers
Expatriate football managers in Kazakhstan
FC Dinamo Minsk managers
FC Slavia Mozyr managers
Kazakhstan national under-21 football team managers
FC Smorgon managers
FC Zvezda-BGU Minsk managers